"Dry September" is a short story by William Faulkner. Published in 1931,  it describes a lynch mob forming (despite ambiguous evidence) on a hot September evening to avenge an alleged (and unspecified) insult or attack upon a white woman by a black watchman, Will Mayes. Told in five parts, the story includes the perspective of the rumored female victim, Miss Minnie Cooper, and of the mob's leader, John McLendon. It is one of Faulkner's shorter stories.

It was originally published in Scribner's magazine, and later appeared in collections of his short stories.

It includes an appearance by Hawkshaw, the barber who was the focus of Faulkner's later story, "Hair".

External links
 Full text of "Dry September", courtesy of the New Bulgarian University
"Dry September" at Digital Yoknapatawpha

1931 short stories
Short stories by William Faulkner
Works originally published in Scribner's Magazine